The Quality of Life Program (QOLP) is one of the Saudi Vision 2030 Realization Programs. It was launched in the middle of 2018 with the strategic aim to improve ‘lifestyle’ and ‘livability’ of individuals, families and communities. This aim is achieved through transforming cities by supporting and creating more choices that foster participation in environmental, cultural, social, entertaining, sporting, and other activities. These activities aim to increase the overall wellbeing while creating additional jobs, diversifying the economy, and improving the overall status of Saudi cities to be among the world's best cities classification.

Livability 
represents the basic standards of living, which include infrastructure and basic services including:
 Infrastructure and Transport
 Housing, Urban Design and Environment
 Health Care
 Economical and educational opportunities
 Security and socio-political environment

Lifestyle 
represents the group of alternatives that support community participation and life enjoyment:
 Entertainment 
 Heritage, Culture and Arts 
 Sports 
 Recreation 
 Social participation 
The program has developed and measures extensive indicators that fall directly and indirectly within the general concept of quality of life. The program today does not include initiatives in the health sector in Saudi Arabia, but its initiatives affect the sector indirectly by providing options and enabling an overall healthy lifestyle.

Vision 2030 Third Level Goals Assigned to the Quality of Life Program 
 Preserving and introducing the Kingdom's Islamic, Arab and national heritage.
 Enhancing sport activities in society.
 Achieving excellence in various sports regionally and internationally.
 Enhancing the quality of services provided in Saudi cities.
 Enhancing the urban planning in Saudi cities.
 Preventing society's use of drug.  
 Developing and diversifying entertainment opportunities to meet the population's needs.
 Increase participation in arts and culture in Saudi.
 Development of the tourism sector.
 Cultivating expatriates’ living conditions.

Quality of life -The Concept 

Quality of life is defined by the World Health Organization as "an individual's perception of their position in life in the context of the culture and value systems in which they live and in relation to their goals, expectations, standards and concerns".

The concept is very broad and cross-cutting and can be defined in many terms. To help build our perception, the QOLP categorizes their efforts into the lifestyle and livability spheres of work.  This main categorization was determined after extensive analysis of leading global indexes which measure various aspects of quality of life.   
Indexes evaluated included:
 The Economist Intelligence Unit's Global Livability Index
 Mercer Quality of Life Index.
 Monocle Magazine Quality of Life Survey.
 UN World Happiness Report.
 OECD Better Life Index.
 AARP Livability Index.

Aspirations of Quality of Life Program 
The Quality of Life Program aspires to make Saudi Arabia one of the best places to live in the world. It aims to achieve its objectives by enabling the necessary transformational projects in parallel with the on-going government scope to position at least three Saudi cities in the best 100 cities in the world by 2030, and works with the necessary stakeholders to achieve this ambition.  
 
All government sectors are working at varying levels to improve the quality of life in the Kingdom according to their scope and field. There are areas that fall directly under the QOLP, and others whose strategic indicators are measured periodically by the QOLP, although they do not fall directly within the scope of the program.

Some of the QOLP's KPIs include:  number of Saudi cities in the top 100 livable cities in the world, number of restaurants and cafes, percentage of shopping malls’ area (square meter per individual), amount of green spaces per capita, number of hobby clubs, percentage of people practicing sports, and number of places for practicing sports.

It is acknowledged, that all government projects outside of the current mandate of the QOLP does in fact positively contribute to the overall enhancement of the quality of life in the country. Projects such as King Salman Park, Green Riyadh, the Red Sea Development Project and Amaala, will contribute to improving the quality of life inside the Kingdom, even though they are not part of the QOLP.

Strategic Pillars of the Quality of Life Program 
The Program currently has nine strategic pillars to achieve its ambitious goals:
Developing cities: which is concerned with infrastructure in Saudi cities to enable positive lifestyles, and provides multiple options for residents in transportation, parks, public spaces, etc.
Providing services: providing best quality services in security, health, education, and economic sectors.
Changing behavior: aims to reinforce positive behaviors by providing options and motivation.
Developing amenities: It includes supporting infrastructure, such as stadiums, squares, public places, parks, and the pillar aims to improve them and increase their use through partnerships with the public and private sectors.
Providing alternatives: It is one of the most prominent strategic pillars of the program, and all strategic pillars are linked to it in one way or another. The objectives of developing alternatives is to enable any area related to positive lifestyles, by supporting talents, expanding the range of entertainment, culture, recreation, tourism options, and improving the quality of services in line with the aspirations of residents and visitors and international best practices.
Encouraging participation: The Quality of Life Program seeks, through this pillar, to encourage residents and visitors to participate in various activities related to the quality of life sectors in order to promote positive lifestyles.
Developing necessary laws and regulations: This pillar includes developing necessary regulations and legislation to improve the quality of life in the Kingdom of Saudi Arabia.
Financial sustainability (private sector enablement/public investments): Among the strategic pillars of the program is the development of administrative and financial models that enable the private sector to contribute to the development of the various quality of life sectors and to ensure the sustainability of financial projects and not depend on government spending.
Effective communication: Through this pillar, the Program works to develop effective communication channels with stakeholders, either inside government agencies, private sectors, or the non-profit sector, to contribute in the development of quality of life in the Kingdom.

The role of Quality of Life Program and stakeholders 
Quality of Life program continues to follow up on the progress of its initiatives to achieve the strategic goals of the Kingdom's Vision 2030 assigned to the program, by setting strategic indicators and implementing projects and initiatives. Performance cards are built for each initiative, including the initiative's scope, description, implementation date, targeted administrative areas, and final outputs to measure its success.
Quality of Life program works to overcome the obstacles facing the stakeholders, also it follows up the implementation, and communicates with the supporting and executive entities, to ensure the efficiency of implementing the initiatives in accordance with the goals set by the Kingdom's Vision 2030.

Stakeholders of the Quality of Life Program 
 Ministry of Culture 
 Ministry of Sports 
 Ministry of Tourism 
 Ministry of Human Resources and Social Development 
 Ministry of Interior Affairs 
 Ministry of Municipal Rural Affairs and Housing 
 Ministry of Education 
 Ministry of Communications and Information Technology 
 General Commission for Audiovisual Media 
 General Entertainment Authority 
 Transport General Authority 
 Saudi Tourism Authority

Achievements of Quality of Life Program 
Given the QOL Program main objective of providing more alternatives within Saudi Arabia, here are some of its recent achievements:
The Kingdom has become a tourist destination for many international events. QOLP launched the electronic tourist visa, which enables tourists from 49 countries to apply for a tourist visa through an electronic visa platform in less than 30 minutes. More than 400,000 visas have been issued so far until March 2020.
The program established the Tourism Development Fund with a capital of 15 billion riyals to empower the tourism sector in the Kingdom by attracting investments and providing financing to tourism establishments. The project has funded more than 67 tourism projects with more than 200 million Saudi riyals. The program launched several programs to develop the skills of human capital in the sector, and more than 50,000 people have been trained as of March 2021.
During the past five years, the Kingdom hosted many international events for the first time in Saudi Arabia.  These events include:  Dakar International Rally, Formula E, Formula 1, the Italian Super Cup, the Spanish Super Cup, etc. as the program launched more than 2,000 sports, cultural and volunteer activities.
In 2018, QOL launched the first cinema, and today, the number has reached 55 cinemas in different regions of the Kingdom.
In the cultural sector, the program has many achievements including the establishment of 11 cultural commissions affiliated to the Ministry of Culture to develop the cultural sector in the Kingdom. The program also launched a cultural awards competition to celebrate cultural achievements, launched programs to sponsor talent, and launched a package of initiatives to support youth in the Kingdom to enter this vital sector. The aim is to encourage cultural content and production to serve the various cultural sectors, enhance the Kingdom's international presence, and enhance the role of the economic sector.
The number of investment opportunities offered through "Forsa" platform for municipal investment has reached about 16.000 opportunities. 
The number of urban heritage sites registered in the National Cultural Heritage has reached 1,000, 6 of them are registered in the World Heritage List (UNESCO).
The area of parks and green spaces has reached more than 37 million square meters.
Launching the Fakher "Pride" program for Paralympic sports.
Establishment of the Royal Institute of Traditional Arts.
Launching the Cultural Development Fund.

Quality of Life Program and Hobbies sector 
One of the main achievements of the Quality of Life program was the launch of the Hobbies Sector in the Kingdom. Several initiatives related to the creation of this new sector included:  establishing a regulatory framework, hobby clubs licensing, digital enablement, content creation, and awareness campaigns supporting on how to practice in a hobby either individually or within a community positively contributes to quality of life.   
The Hobby Clubs Association (Hawi) and its bylaws were approved, with the membership of 11 government agencies, to become the entity responsible for establishing and enabling hobby clubs governed by the Quality of Life Program Center.
“Hawi” is the organizational entity for the establishment and registration of hobby clubs in the Kingdom for citizens and residents.  Its main aim is to build communities and create a national network revolving around hobbies.   The organization also focuses on transferring experiences and international best practices to these clubs and raising awareness of their importance.
The program launched the electronic platform "Hawi" https://hawi.gov.sa/ to enable the hobbies sector digitally. “Hawi” Association aims to contribute in creating an incubating environment for hobby groups, offering operational and financial support. Too, raising awareness of the importance of practicing and developing hobbies to stimulate creative thinking and community building, providing facilities in order to build a vibrant society, and activating community partnerships with local, regional and international institutions. In addition to holding seminars, lectures, and training courses related to hobbies inside and outside the kingdom of Saudi Arabia, and exchanging experiences with local and international institutions.
Among the services provided by “Hawi” platform to the public are the establishment of hobby clubs, membership registration, management of hobby club members and their activities, applying support requests, clarifying the regulations governing the sector, in addition to booking incubators and facilities, and conducting training courses.

External links 
 Quality of Life Program 2020 (Delivery plan).

References 

Society of Saudi Arabia
Saudi Arabia